Bixadus sierricola is a species of beetle in the family Cerambycidae, and the only species in the genus Bixadus. It was described by White in 1858.

References

Lamiini
Beetles described in 1858